The University of Novo Mesto (UNM) is a private university in Slovenia. It is located in the town of Novo Mesto.

Organization
Faculties:

 Faculty of Economics and Informatics
 Faculty of Business and Management Sciences
 Faculty of Health Sciences
 Faculty of Mechanical Engineering

Notes

External links 
  

 
2017 establishments in Slovenia
Universities in Slovenia
Educational institutions established in 2017
Buildings and structures in Novo Mesto